From Darkness is a British psychological crime drama that premiered on BBC One on 4 October 2015. The series stars Anne-Marie Duff as former police officer Claire Church. A total of four episodes were broadcast. A DVD of the complete series was released on 9 November 2015. Internationally, the series premiered in Australia on 1 November 2015, on BBC First.

Plot
Claire Church, a former police officer who moves away to the remote Western Isles in an attempt to escape the violent past that still haunts her, finds herself pulled back by her former lover and colleague DCI John Hind, and his new DS Anthony Boyce, into an investigation she thought she had left well behind. When two victims are uncovered beneath the murky depths of a Manchester building site, Hind links them to a serial killer whose identity has not been discovered. Now, 17 years on, he appears to be killing again. But can Church and Hind piece together all of the clues – old and new – to finally discover the killer's identity?

Cast
 Anne-Marie Duff as Claire Church
 Johnny Harris as DCI John Hind
 Caroline Lee-Johnson as Superintendent Lola Keir
 Luke Newberry as DS Anthony Boyce
 Leanne Best as Julie Hind
 Richard Rankin as Norrie Duncan
 Emma Edmondson as DC Rachel Weir
 Lyndsey Marshal as Lucy Maxley
 Adrian Rawlins as Gareth Harding
 Josh Taylor as Ollie Hind

Episode list

Reception
The series had a mixed reception from critics.

The List summarised their review: "We've walked this road too many times before. There's nothing blatantly wrong with From Darkness – it's well produced, the acting is uniformly good, the story intriguing – but after The Killing, The Bridge, even Shetland, it feels anonymous."

News site Metro said "Not a fan of police procedural dramas? Good, because this ain’t that.  From Darkness is a character-driven tale of one women’s journey and resolve and it includes a bloody brilliant performance by Duff.  It’s full of atmospheric music – the opening credits gave us chills alone – and perfectly placed flashbacks keeping you hooked on Claire’s story."

Sam Wollaston in The Guardian called it intriguing but derivative.

References

External links
 
 

BBC high definition shows
BBC television dramas
2010s British drama television series
2015 British television series debuts
2015 British television series endings
British crime drama television series
British detective television series
2010s British television miniseries
English-language television shows
Television shows set in the United Kingdom